Ineta Ziemele (born 12 February 1970) is Latvian jurist and judge at the Constitutional Court of the Republic of Latvia since 2015. On 8 May 2017 she was elected to be the President of the Constitutional Court.

In 1995, she was a founding member of the Latvian Section of the International Commission of Jurists.

From 27 April 2005 to 2015 she was a judge at the European Court of Human Rights(ECHR). In September 2012 she became President of the Court's Fourth Section. As a judge of the ECHR, she was cited in an NGO report for possible conflicts of interest. The report shows that she seated in six cases where the International Commission of Jurists was involved and others cases where the Open Society Justice Initiative(OSJI) and other relatives organizations were involved (the OSJI is cited because she is a professor at the Riga Graduate School of Law, funded by the Open Society Foundation-Latvia)

She graduated from the Law Faculty of the University of Latvia in 1993 and continued her studies in Sweden, where she earned a master's degree in International law. She went on to earn her doctoral degree from University of Cambridge at Wolfson College. She has worked as an adviser for the Foreign Affairs Committee of the Saeima and for the Prime Minister of Latvia. She also has been a professor at the University of Latvia and the Riga Graduate School of Law.

On 2 September 2020 she was appointed to be a judge at the Court of Justice of the European Union for the period from 7 September 2020 to 6 October 2024.

Books

References

External links

Ineta Ziemele at Constitutional Court of the Republic of Latvia

1970 births
Living people
Alumni of Wolfson College, Cambridge
Constitutional court women judges
Judges of the Constitutional Court of Latvia
Judges of the European Court of Human Rights
Latvian judges of international courts and tribunals
Latvian women judges
University of Latvia alumni
Academic staff of the University of Latvia
21st-century Latvian judges
21st-century women judges